Alisson Alves Farias (born 7 April 1996) is a Brazilian footballer who plays as a forward for CRB.

Honours 
 Internacional
 Campeonato Gaúcho: 2015, 2016

References

1996 births
Living people
People from Lages
Brazilian footballers
Association football forwards
Brazilian expatriate footballers
Expatriate footballers in Portugal
Campeonato Brasileiro Série A players
Campeonato Brasileiro Série B players
Primeira Liga players
Sport Club Internacional players
G.D. Estoril Praia players
Criciúma Esporte Clube players
Grêmio Esportivo Brasil players
Coritiba Foot Ball Club players
Sport Club do Recife players
Clube de Regatas Brasil players
Sportspeople from Santa Catarina (state)